Debbie White (born 23 April 1978 in Balclutha, New Zealand) is a New Zealand netball player. White played domestic netball for the Otago Rebels in the National Bank Cup from 1999 to 2007, becoming the franchise's most capped player. In 2005, she gained selection for the New Zealand national squad, the Silver Ferns, and debuted for the team in 2006 against Australia. With the start of the ANZ Championship in 2008, White signed up with the Southern Steel. For the 2009 season, she transferred the Northern Mystics.

References

New Zealand international netball players
Northern Mystics players
Southern Steel players
ANZ Championship players
Sportspeople from Balclutha, New Zealand
1978 births
Living people
Otago Rebels players